The Illinois state park system began in 1908 with what is now Fort Massac State Park becoming the first park in a system encompassing over 60 parks and about the same number of recreational and wildlife areas.

The parks range from small day-use affairs to larger parks that boast everything from fancy lodges and canyons to powerboating on large lakes. The parks are free to enter and offer campgrounds with seasonal pricing for primitive to RV campsites.

See also 
List of Illinois state parks

References

State parks of Illinois